Representations is an interdisciplinary journal in the humanities published quarterly by the University of California Press. The journal was established in 1983 and is the founding publication of the New Historicism movement of the 1980s. It covers topics including literary, historical, and cultural studies. The founding editorial board was chaired by Stephen Greenblatt and Svetlana Alpers. Representations frequently publishes thematic special issues, for example, the 2007 issue on the legacies of American Orientalism, the 2006 issue on cross-cultural mimesis, and the 2005 issue on political and intellectual redress.

Topics covered 
 The Body, Gender, and Sexuality
 Culture and Law
 Empire, Imperialism, and The New World
 History and Memory
 Music
 Narrative and Poetics
 National Identities
 Philosophy and Religion
 Politics and Aesthetics
 Race and Ethnicity
 Science Studies
 Society, Class, and Power
 Visual Culture

Anthologies 
The UC Press Representations books series has collected and reprinted many essays originally published in the journal, including:
 The Making of the Modern Body: Sexuality and Society in the Nineteenth Century, edited by Catherine Gallagher and Thomas Laqueur
 Representing the English Renaissance, edited by Stephen Greenblatt
 Misogyny, Misandry, Misanthropy, edited by R. Howard Bloch and Frances Ferguson
 Law and the Order of Culture, edited by Robert Post
 The New American Studies: Essays from Representations, edited by Philip Fisher
 New World Encounters, edited by Stephen Greenblatt
 Future Libraries, edited by R. Howard Bloch and Carla Hesse
 The Fate of "Culture": Geertz and Beyond, edited by Sherry B. Ortner

References

Further reading 

 Randolph Starn, "Making Representations", Chronicle of the University of California, 6 (Spring 2004): 160-167.

External links 
 

University of California Press academic journals
Multidisciplinary humanities journals
Publications established in 1983
Quarterly journals
English-language journals